Five Pieces 1975 is an album by American jazz saxophonist Anthony Braxton recorded in 1975 and released on the Arista label. The album was subsequently included on The Complete Arista Recordings of Anthony Braxton released by Mosaic Records in 2008.

Reception
The Allmusic review by Scott Yanow awarded the album 4½ stars stating "The tightness of his very alert and versatile group and the strength of the compositions make this one of Anthony Braxton's most rewarding records of the mid-1970s".

Track listing
All compositions by Anthony Braxton except where noted.
 "You Stepped Out of a Dream" (Nacio Herb Brown, Gus Kahn) - 7:09 
   - 4:35 
  - 8:05 
  - 17:17 
   - 3:23
Recorded at Generation Sound Studios in New York on July 1 (track 1) & July 2 (tracks 2-5), 1975

Personnel
Anthony Braxton - sopranino saxophone, alto saxophone, clarinet, contrabass clarinet, flute, alto flute
Kenny Wheeler - trumpet, flugelhorn
Dave Holland - bass
Barry Altschul - drums

References

Arista Records albums
Anthony Braxton albums
1975 albums
Albums produced by Michael Cuscuna